Birds of Paradise is the English dub of Plumíferos a 2010 Argentine computer-animated adventure comedy film directed by Daniel De Felippo and Gustavo Giannini and featuring the voices of Drake Bell, Ashley Tisdale, Jon Lovitz, Ken Jeong, Jane Lynch and Keith David.

English voice cast
Drake Bell as Jack
Keith David as Old Buzzard
Ken Jeong as Vinnie
Jon Lovitz as Skeeter
Jane Lynch as Rosie
Ashley Tisdale as Aurora

Reception
Barbara Schultz of Common Sense Media awarded the film three stars out of five.

References

External links
 
 

2010 computer-animated films
2010 films
Argentine animated films
2010s Spanish-language films
2010s Argentine films
Mockbuster films